MIK could refer to:

 Methyl isopropyl ketone, a solvent
 FC MiK Kaluga, former Russian football team, now merged into FC Kaluga
 MIK (character set), a Bulgarian character code set used with DOS
 Multiple-Indicator Kriging, a statistical interpolation method
 Montazhno-Ispytatelnyi Kompleks, the Roscosmos assembly-test facility for space vehicles

Transport
 MIK, MTR station code for Ming Kum stop, Hong Kong
 MIK, National Rail station code for Micklefield railway station, England
 MIK, IATA code for Mikkeli Airport, Finland